Sigma Star Saga is a 2005 hybrid science fiction role-playing-space-shooter developed by WayForward Technologies and published by Namco for the Game Boy Advance. The player explores a standard 2-D overworld, but is transported into space for side-scrolling shooter random battles. The story focus on a space pilot named Ian Recker who goes undercover against Earth's enemies, the Krill, in a battle to save the planet.

Gameplay
There are two distinct portions of the game: an overworld where the player control Recker directly, and side-scrolling shooter random battles.

Overworld
In the overworld, Recker travels around either talking to people to advance the plot or searching for items and data on one of several planets. As the game progresses, his abilities expand: he is given more weapons to fight the local flora and fauna, and he receives power-ups that let him pass different barriers to his progress.

Ship Battles
As the player traverse the various planets, they are frequently transported into space to pilot the Krill defense fleet surrounding each planet. The ships are biological in nature and semiautonomous: they only require a pilot when they sense danger. In most battles, the player are required to shoot down a certain number of enemies to end the sequence.

The ship battles are where the RPG elements of the game come in: as the player kill enemies, they drop experience bubbles, which power up the offensive and defensive capabilities. The player can further increase their abilities through the Gun Data system.

Unlike many shooters, there is no need to have a fixed ship in this game. The player are transported to a different ship in one of half a dozen classes, chosen randomly by the game. In some battles they will fly a small, agile attack ship, in some a bomber, and in some a lumbering cargo vessel.

Gun Data
The Gun Data system allows the player to customize how their ship fires its weapons. There are three categories that can be changed: cannon, bullet, and impact. The cannon alters the direction and manner in which the bullets fire (forwards, backwards, rapid fire, etc.), Bullet alters the shot type (large, long-range, chargeable, etc.), and Impact determines what the bullet does when it hits an enemy (explodes, drops health, etc.). The game includes dozens of different options for each data, mostly found by exploration in the overworld. The total number of combinations is 15,680, although only one can be used in any given battle.

Story
The main character is Ian Recker, a decorated pilot who goes undercover to investigate the enemy species known as Krill. The Krill attacked Earth by gouging out a hole the size of Canada under the Atlantic Ocean, which caused the oceans to boil, nearly destroying all life on Earth. Recker gets "captured" by the Krill, who outfit him with a Krill parasite suit that makes him stronger and faster than a normal human being, and enables him to fly their biological ships. He quickly becomes embroiled in a race across several planets for control of mysterious "bio-matter" in the cores of the planets.  After several betrayals, it becomes apparent that the "bio-matter" is in fact a monstrous weapon, and both the Krill High Command and Recker's superiors are after it. The plot is complicated by the existence of a virus, first considered a biological weapon against the Krill, but which turns out to destroy the "bio-matter".

Characters
Much of the game revolves around the shifting relationships between Recker's female companions: the Krill pilot, Psyme, and the human scientist, Scarlet.  Neither trusts the other, and Recker is torn between maintaining his cover with Psyme and protecting his fellow human Scarlet from the Krill.

Other important characters include the commanders of various Krill starbases, Commander Tierney, Recker's commanding officer, and Blune, a Krill officer who complicates matters as the game goes on.  Tierney is named after Adam Tierney, part of the development team for the game.

Endings
Depending on the actions taken in the last chapter of the story, there are four different endings with different scenes at the end; specifically, the ending depends on whether Psyme and/or Scarlet die in the last chapter.  Although Psyme can be saved in the first playthrough, Scarlet will die in the first playthrough and cannot be saved unless the player resumes from a New Game+ game.

Also, a special ending is shown if both Psyme and Scarlet are saved and all of the Gun Data is collected.

Reception

Sigma Star Saga received "average" reviews according to the review aggregation website Metacritic. Greg Kasavin of GameSpot praised the game's original ideas of blending elements from the shoot 'em up genre with the role-playing genre, but noted that gameplay can get tedious after backtracking certain areas of the game.

References

External links
Official website

2005 video games
Game Boy Advance games
Game Boy Advance-only games
Namco games
Role-playing video games
Science fiction video games
Scrolling shooters
Video games developed in the United States
WayForward games
Single-player video games